Pebbles, Volume 5 is a compilation album in the Pebbles series that has been issued in both LP and CD formats.

Release data
This album was released on BFD Records in 1980.  AIP Records kept the LP in print for many years.  

AIP Records issued this volume in CD format in 1992.  Although having a somewhat different cover, the two formats are largely the same album and even have similar catalogue numbers.

Two box sets of the first five volumes of the Pebbles series have also been released, the Pebbles Box on LP (in 1987) and the Trash Box on CD (in 2004).

Omitted tracks on the CD

When AIP Records issued the early volumes of CDs, they omitted some tracks from the corresponding LP for the stated reason that they were already widely available on other anthologies.  In this case, all of the tracks on the LP are included on the CD and in the same order, although "You Need Love" shows a different band name.  Thus, the CD has only 3 bonus tracks.

Track listing

LP

Side 1:

 The Tree: "No Good Woman", 2:36" – rel. 1967
 The Plague: "Go Away", 1:51
 The Magi: "You Don't Know Me", 2:28
 The Gentlemen: "It's a Cry'n Shame", 2:30
 The 5 Canadians: "Writing on the Wall", 2:18
 The Dirty Wurds: "Why", 2:19
 The Merry Dragons: "Universal Vagrant", 2:54 – rel. 1966
 The Fe-Fi-Four Plus 2: "I Wanna Come Back (From the World of LSD)", 2:16

Side 2:

 The Escapades: "I Tell No Lies", 1:59
 Danny & the Escorts: "You Need Love", 2:32
 The Satyrs: "Yesterday's Hero", 2:41
 Little Phil & the Night Shadows: "The Way it Used to Be", 2:01
 The State of Mind: "Move", 2:09
 Yesterday's Children: "Wanna Be with You", 2:27
 The Time Stoppers: "I Need Love", 2:30
 Thursday's Children: "You'll Never Be My Girl", 2:03
 The 12 A.M.: "The Way I Feel", 2:18 – rel. 1967

CD
 The Tree: "No Good Woman" — rel. 1967
 The Plague: "Go Away" — rel. 1966?
 The Magi: "You Don't Know Me" — rel. 1971?
 The Gentlemen:  "It's a Cryin' Shame" — rel. 1966?
 The Five Canadians: "Writing on the Wall" — rel. 1966
 Dirty Wurds: "Why" — rel. 1966
 The Merry Dragons: "Universal Vagrant" — rel. 1966
 The Fe-Fi-Four Plus 2: "I Wanna Come Back (From the World of LSD)" — rel. 1967?
 The Escapades: "I Tell No Lies" — rel. 1966
 Danny and the Counts: "You Need Love" — rel. 1966
 The Satyrs: "Yesterday's Hero" — rel. 1967?
 Little Phil & the Night Shadows: "The Way It Used to Be" — rel. 1966
 The State of Mind: "Move" — rel. 1967?
 Yesterday's Children: "Wanna Be with You" — rel. 1966?
 The Time Stoppers: "I Need Love" — rel. 1967
 Thursday's Children: "You'll Never Be My Girl" — rel. 1966
 The 12 A.M.: "The Way I Feel" — rel. 1967
 The Shags: "Stop & Listen" — rel. 1967
 The Sound Barrier: "(My) Baby's Gone" — rel. 1966?
 The Traits: "High on a Cloud" — rel. 1966?

Release history

LP

BFD Records (#BFD-5022) — 1979

AIP Records – several reissues

CD
AIP Records (#AIP-CD-5022) — 1992

References                 

Pebbles (series) albums
1980 compilation albums